Rev. Bryan Fairfax, 8th Lord Fairfax of Cameron (17361802) was an Anglican clergyman and Scottish peer (the title was created in 1627 before the Union of 1707). He was a lifelong friend of George Washington and became the first American-born Lord Fairfax; his predecessors were born in the UK. The Rev. The Lord Fairfax was the first cousin once removed of the seventh Lord. He lived in Virginia. He was the grandson of Reverend the Hon. Henry Fairfax, second son of the fourth Lord. However, it wasn't until 1800 that he was confirmed in the title by the House of Lords.

Early life and family

Bryan Fairfax was the son of Col. William Fairfax (1691–1757) of Belvoir and Deborah Clarke (1708–1746).  As a young man, Fairfax lived at Belvoir with his father who was the business agent for his cousin, Thomas Fairfax, 6th Lord Fairfax of Cameron. His brother, George William (1729–1787) and his wife, Sally Cary Fairfax (1730–1811), also lived there and were close neighbors to George Washington's Mount Vernon. As a young man, George Washington and his brother, Lawrence Washington (1718–1752), visited the Fairfax family at Belvoir often and Lord Fairfax employed Washington to join a surveying team of his western lands, in the valley of Virginia.

Peerage

Fairfax did not pursue his peerage until 1798, while on a business trip to England. The previous Lord Fairfax, his cousin Robert, had died in 1793. After his death in 1802, his widow sued his executor, but the Supreme Court found for the executor in 1809.  His son Thomas Fairfax became the 9th Lord Fairfax of Cameron.

Career and land holdings

In 1740, he was deeded , and 1741 was deeded , at Little Run or Hunger Run.

In 1754, Bryan Fairfax clerked for his brother-in-law, John Carlyle (1720–1780), in Alexandria, Virginia, and was appointed as a deputy clerk for Fairfax County.  Bryan Fairfax served as a lieutenant in George Washington's militia regiment, in George Mercer's company early in the French and Indian War, but he resigned his commission in 1756. He later served as a justice for Fairfax County at the same time as Washington.  Fairfax was an avid foxhunter, and he and Washington often rode together.

As a large landowner, Fairfax was active leasing out his property to smaller farmers, such as Perrygreen Mackness 

In 1772, he deeded a  farm, Chattins Run, on Goose Creek, in Fauquier County, Virginia to Washington to repay a debt.

In 1773, Fairfax deeded Towlston Grange to his daughter Elizabeth and her husband, David Griffith.

Revolutionary War

When the Fairfax Resolves were debated in 1774, Fairfax corresponded with George Washington, the chairman of the committee considering the Resolves.

Fairfax was torn over the question of American independence during the American Revolutionary War. In 1777, he tried to travel to England and was arrested in Lancaster, Pennsylvania for refusing to sign an oath of loyalty. He wrote to George Washington, who sent him a pass to allow him to travel between the lines. In New York, British officials also desired an oath of loyalty as a prerequisite for transit. Fairfax again refused and returned home. While en route, he visited Washington at Valley Forge.

Correspondence with Washington

When the Fairfax Resolves were debated in 1774, Fairfax sent letters to George Washington, the chairman of the committee considering the Resolves, giving reasons why they should not be adopted:

For I think myself bound to oppose violent measures now.  The entering upon a Plan of having no Trade would be an arduous undertaking.  I mean if persisted in, and if once entered upon it ought to be strictly kept.  I therefore think it would be more proper to try first what Effect a petition might have toward obtaining a repeal of the Duty.

However, Washington responded:

As to your political sentiments, I would heartily join you in them, so far as relates to a humble and dutiful petition to the throne, provided there was the most distant hope of success. But have we not tried this already? Have we not addressed the Lords, and remonstrated to the Commons? And to what end? Did they deign to look at our petitions?  Does it not appear, as clear as the sun in its meridan brightness, that there is a regular, systematic plan formed to fix the right & practise of taxation upon us?George Washington letter to Bryan Fairfax, 4 July 1774, familytales

But he added:

Bryan Fairfax respectfully disagreed:

There is a new opinion now lately advanced in Virginia that the Parliament have no right to make any or scarce any Laws binding on the Colonies. It has given me much Uneasiness. For altho' I wish as much as any one that we were legally exempted from it, yet I hold it clearly that we ought to abide by our Constitution. The common Consent and Acquiescence in the Colonies for such a Length of time is to me a clear Proof of their having a Right. And altho' it is said that it has only been exercised in Matters of Trade, it will be found to be a Mistake.

Later during September, 1777, Fairfax was detained in Lancaster, Pennsylvania.  However, he wrote to Washington, who sent him a pass to travel between the lines:

Washington wrote him back:

The difference in our political Sentiments never made any change in my friendship for you, and the favorable Sentiments I ever entertained of your hon'r, leaves me without a doubt that you would say any thing, or do any thing injurious to the cause we are engaged in after having pledged your word to the contrary.  I therefore give my consent readily ...

Marriage

In 1757, after a whirlwind social scene in Westmoreland and Essex County, his brother-in-law John Carlyle caught up with him in the Annapolis gaol and brought him back to Belvoir.

In 1759, he married Elizabeth Cary (1738–1778), daughter of Colonel Wilson Cary and Sarah Pate.  Elizabeth was the sister of his brother's wife, Sally Cary Fairfax. Together, Bryan and Elizabeth had three children:
Sally Cary Fairfax (1760-?)
Thomas Fairfax, 9th Lord Fairfax of Cameron (1762–1846), who married three times. First to Mary Aylett, then Laura Washington, and finally to Margaret Herbert
Ferdinando Fairfax (1766–1820), who married Elizabeth Blair Cary. George Washington and Martha Washington traveled to Towlston Grange to stand as godparents for Fedinando.
William Fairfax (1765–1782)
Robert Fairfax (died as a child)
Henry Fairfax (died as a child)
Elizabeth Fairfax (1770–?), who married David Griffith

After his wife's death, Fairfax married Jennie Dennison (d. 1805).  With her, he had another daughter:
Anne Fairfax (born c. 1783), who married Charles Jefferson Catlett, Esq., a merchant from Norfolk, Virginia.

From 1760 until 1765, Fairfax lived at Greenhill (Accotink Creek and Back Road, now Telegraph Road).  He later moved to Towlston Grange (Difficult Run and Leesburg Pike, now Route 7), where he lived from 1768 until 1790. In 1790, he moved to Mount Eagle, (south of Hunting Creek, and Alexandria), where he lived until his death.

In popular culture

On rap musician Logic's 2017 album Everybody in the song "Waiting Room," Bryan Fairfax is described as the next reincarnation of the character Atom.

See also

Lord Fairfax of Cameron

References

External links
Walking with Washington, Robert L. Madison, Gateway Press, Baltimore, Md, 2003
A Fairfax Friendship: The Complete Correspondence between George Washington and Bryan Fairfax 1754 – 1799, Sweig and David, Fairfax County History Commission, Jan 1982, LOC 81-70298
Papers of George Washington
Loyalism in Eighteenth Century, Alexandria, Virginia, Marshall Stopher Kiker, 2001 Winter, Historic Alexandria Quarterly
 Appletons' Cyclopaedia of American Biography, James Grant Wilson, John Fiske
The Fairfax Family in Fairfax County,Kenton Kilmer and Donald Sweig, May 1975, Fairfax County Office of Comprehensive Planning under the direction  of the County Board of Supervisors, in cooperation with the County History Commission.

1736 births
1802 deaths
18th-century American Episcopalians
19th-century American Episcopalians
American Episcopal clergy
American planters
British North American Anglicans
Businesspeople from Virginia
Cary family of Virginia
Bryan
People from Fairfax County, Virginia
People of Virginia in the French and Indian War
American people of English descent
People from Fort Belvoir, Virginia
Lords Fairfax of Cameron